Ngee Ann Secondary School (NASS) is a co-educational government-aided autonomous secondary school in Tampines, Singapore. Founded in 1994 by the Ngee Ann Kongsi, a Teochew clan foundation, Ngee Ann Secondary School is a successor to the now defunct Tuan Mong High School. The school offers secondary education leading to the Singapore-Cambridge GCE Ordinary Level or Singapore-Cambridge GCE Normal Level examination.

History

Principals

Campus
Ngee Ann Secondary School is located in proximity to two establishments; Tampines Mart and Tampines 201 which students frequent for lunch and meetings. The school is adjacent to Tampines East MRT station on the Downtown line.

Academic information 
Being a government secondary school, Ngee Ann Secondary School offers three academic streams, namely the four-year Express course, as well as the Normal Course, comprising Normal (Academic) and Normal (Technical) academic tracks.

O Level Express Course 
The Express Course is a nationwide four-year programme that leads up to the Singapore-Cambridge GCE Ordinary Level examination.

Academic subjects 
The examinable academic subjects for Singapore-Cambridge GCE Ordinary Level offered by Ngee Ann Secondary School for upper secondary level (via. streaming in secondary 2 level), as of 2019, are listed below.

Normal Course 
The Normal Course is a nationwide 4-year programme leading to the Singapore-Cambridge GCE Normal Level examination, which runs either the Normal (Academic) curriculum or Normal (Technical) curriculum, abbreviated as N(A) and N(T) respectively.

Normal (Academic) Course 
In the Normal (Academic) course, students offer 5-8 subjects in the Singapore-Cambridge GCE Normal Level examination. Compulsory subjects include:
 English Language
 Mother Tongue Language
 Mathematics
 Combined Humanities
A 5th year leading to the Singapore-Cambridge GCE Ordinary Level examination is available to N(A) students who perform well in their Singapore-Cambridge GCE Normal Level examination. Students can move from one course to another based on their performance and the assessment of the school principal and teachers.

Normal (Technical) Course 
The Normal (Technical) course prepares students for a technical-vocational education at the Institute of Technical Education. Students will offer 5-7 subjects in the Singapore-Cambridge GCE Normal Level examination. The curriculum is tailored towards strengthening students’ proficiency in English and Mathematics. Students take English Language, Mathematics, Basic Mother Tongue and Computer Applications as compulsory subjects.

Notable alumni
Romeo Tan - Actor Mediacorp

Gallery

References

External links 
 

Autonomous schools in Singapore
Educational institutions established in 1994
Secondary schools in Singapore
Tampines
1994 establishments in Singapore